In Control is Kary Ng's second solo album released on June 8, 2007 in CD+DVD and CD formats. It is the champion of the album award of the four channels in Hong Kong in 2007.

Track listing
Unless otherwise specified, the songs below were sung in Cantonese.

 " (Folk songs)" feat. Justin Lo) Mountain Song
 "" Separate Ways
 "" Under Too Much Pressure
 Let Me Go
 Control (Cantonese)
 "" (Mandarin) Loved for a Moment
 "" Love in the Circus
 Mr. Sorry
 "" Out of Control
 "" Fear
 "" Motto
 Control (Mandarin)

2007 albums
Kary Ng albums